Coolalie was a small railway station on the Main South railway line in New South Wales, Australia. It opened in 1891 and closed to passenger services in 1975. It consisted of short side platforms on each of the mainlines. The signal box survived for a time after the platforms were demolished, little trace of the station now survives.

References

Disused regional railway stations in New South Wales
Railway stations in Australia opened in 1891
Railway stations closed in 1975
Main Southern railway line, New South Wales